United States v. Smith could refer to:

United States v. Smith (1820), 18 U.S. (5 Wheat.) 153 (1820), on the definition of piracy
United States v. Smith (1888), 124 U.S. 525 (1888), in the list of United States Supreme Court cases, volume 124
United States v. Smith (1932), 286 U.S. 6 (1932)

See also
Smith v. United States (disambiguation)